James Howell (c. 1594 – 1666) was a 17th-century Anglo-Welsh historian and writer who is in many ways a representative figure of his age. The son of a Welsh clergyman, he was for much of his life in the shadow of his elder brother Thomas Howell, who became Lord Bishop of Bristol.

Education
In 1613 he gained his B.A. from Jesus College, Oxford – he was to be elected to a fellowship at Jesus College in 1623, but he was never formally admitted and his place was taken by another in 1626. Until he was 13, he was schooled in Hereford. He went to Oxford at the age of 19.

Career
After graduation, he had a variety of employments, as an administrator for a glass manufacturer, and in the often combined roles of secretary and instructor to several noble families. As factory agent and negotiator he traveled widely in Europe and learned to speak several languages, apparently with great facility. He also met and befriended numerous literary figures, among them Ben Jonson and Kenelm Digby. Paramount amongst his priorities was however royal, or at least aristocratic patronage.

On the eve of the English Civil War, he finally gained a secretaryship of the Privy Council, which according to one eminent critic, was "very close to the type of appointment that he had sought for 20 years". The conflict meant that he never took up the position, and at about the same time, he wrote his first book, or "maiden Fancy", Dodona's Grove, which represented the history of England and Europe through the allegorical framework of a typology of trees. It is worth noting that he started to publish at this time of ferment although he was already well established as a writer of what we would know today as 'newsletters' but were then known as 'tracts' or 'pamphlets'.

He was a prolific writer, and he is among the first writers to earn his living solely from writing in the English language. He was also the first writer of an epistolary novel, a novel of letters, in English (Familiar Letters).

To lexicography Howell contributed his quadrilingual Lexicon Tetraglotton in 1660. This lexicon also contains a thematic dictionary in 52 sections, ranging from anatomy to cosmology. Howell's Proverbs, although separately printed, was bound and sold with his Lexicon Tetraglotton. John Worthington, writing in his Diary in August 1661, recommended the separate republication of the Proverbs with its collection of British (i.e. Welsh) proverbs because the Lexicon itself "is not so desirable". 

Howell was imprisoned in Fleet Prison in 1643, ostensibly as an insolvent debtor, although his political criticisms in Dodona's Grove may have also played a part. Howell continued to write and publish from prison. He was released in 1651. He dedicated Some Sober Reflections (1656) to Cromwell, praising him for ending the Rump Parliament in 1653, obsequiously fawning over the Protector in the process, ending his dedication, "I rest in the lowliest posture of obedience."

In 1650, Howell revised and expanded Cotgrave and Sherwood's French and English dictionary of 1632, under the title A French-English Dictionary. He added a 21-page French grammar to the work in 1650, but the title page did not advertise this grammar until the 1660 edition; this grammar has often been mistakenly cited as a separate publication.

He wrote A New English Grammar with notes on travel in Spain and Portugal "for the service of Her Majesty". 

Some modern historians of formal English consider Howell's New English Grammar a work of foreign language teaching and the first work of its kind in the English language.

Howell's Proverbs contains the famous saying: "All work and no play, makes Jack a dull boy".

Principal literary works
Howell, James. Dendrologia, Dodona's Grove, or the Vocall Forest.(Part 2) Allegory. 1640.
England's Teares for the present Warres (addendum to some editions Dodona's grove)
Familiar Letters or Epistolae Ho-Elianae. 1645–50.
Instructions for Forraine Travell. 1642; 
Louis XIII. 1646
A Perfect Description of the Country of Scotland 1649
 The Vision, or, A Dialog between the Soul and the Bodie : fancied in a morning-dream. 1651. 
Londonopolis: An Historical Discourse or Perlustration of the City of London. 1657
Lexicon Tetraglotton. 1660.
Paramoigraphy (Proverbs). 1659.
Parley of Beasts
Preheminence and Pedigree of Parliament 1677
Translation: Beginning, Continuance and Decay of Estates.(from French)
Discourse of Dunkirk 1664
Some Sober Inspections 1656.
Observations. Finett (JH Editor)
St.Paul's Late Progress
A Survay of the Signorie of Venice
 The German diet on the Balance of Europe (1653)
A New English Grammar prescribing certain Rules as the language will bear for Foreigners to learn English
History of the late revolution in the Kingdom of Naples 1650.
Perambulation of Spain and Portugal
 The last will and testament of the late renowned Cardinal Mazarini, deceased February 27, 1660 together with some historical remarques of his life. Translation JH.
 The Venice Looking Glass

Literary criticism
Daniel Woolf : Constancy and Ambition in the work of James Howell
Javier Escribano : Proverbios, Refránes Y Traducción (Lexicon Tetraglotton)
Paul Seaward: (1988) A Restoration Publicist:James Howell and the Earl of Clarendon, 1661-6
 W H Vann's Catalogue of Howell works (c. 1920)
 Sanchez Sederi English Grammar

Legacy
The memorial to James Howell in the Temple Church for which he paid himself, as mentioned in his will of 1666, was destroyed in World War II.

Notes

External links

Essays by James Howell at Quotidiana.org
Lustra Ludovici, or the Life of the late Victorious King of France, Lewis the XIII. (And of his Cardinall de Richelieu.) Divided into seven lustres. Consilium Armorum Cardo. (London, 1646)
 

1590s births
1666 deaths
Welsh essayists
17th-century Welsh historians
Welsh satirists
Alumni of Jesus College, Oxford
Fellows of Jesus College, Oxford
Linguists of English